Visakhapatnam Junction (station code: VSKP) is a Important railway station located in Visakhapatnam in the Indian state of Andhra Pradesh. It is on the Howrah–Chennai main line It is operated by East coast Railway  till now and it may take some time to administered under the South Coast Railway zone by Indian Railways.Originally named the Waltair railway station, it was founded in 1896. In 1987, it was renamed Visakhapatnam.

History 

The station was founded as Waltair railway station in 1896, and Bengal Nagpur Railway's line to Cuttack was opened on 1 January 1899. The southern part was subsequently merged with Madras and Southern Mahratta Railway.

Routes 

Visakhapatnam has been a busy station since it was part of the East Coast Railway zone to today.  Platforms are not always available for incoming trains, and the average train's halt period is at least 20 minutes.

The Route Relay Interlocking (RRI) system is an arrangement of signal apparatus, preventing conflicting movements through an arrangement of tracks such as junctions or crossings. It is a cause for trains being delayed after they pass through Duvvada.

Another route, the Godavari Express of the South Central Railway, passes into Visakhapatnam.

Infrastructure 
There are eight platforms, most of which are the same size, and all of the tracks are broad-gauge and electrified.

The station features escalators and a bus station. A majority of platforms are wheelchair-friendly and accessible via ramp.

Over 200 employees work in the station.

Amenities 

There are Wi-Fi facilities and a 'fun zone' for children. The east and west terminals are equipped with reservation counters.

Sheds 
The Diesel Loco Shed at Visakhapatnam is the largest of Indian Railways, with a capacity to accommodate 300 diesel locomotives. The electric loco shed can accommodate 297 locomotives.

Environmental work 

Visakhapatnam has been named the cleanest railway station in the country by the Quality Council of India and earned a platinum rating for being environmentally friendly from the Indian Green Building Council (IGBC).

See also 
List of railway stations in India

References

External links 
 

Railway stations in Visakhapatnam
Railway stations in Waltair railway division
Railway stations in India opened in 1896
Indian Railway A1 Category Stations